The Christian National Union for the Reconstruction of Haiti (Union Nationale Chrétienne pour la Reconstruction d'Haïti) is a political party in Haiti. In the presidential elections of 7 February 2006, its candidate Jean Chavannes Jeune won 5,6% of the popular vote. The party won in the 7 February 2006 Senate elections 4.3% of the popular vote and 2 out of 30 Senators. In the 7 February and 21 April 2006 Chamber of Deputies elections, the party won 12 out of 99 seats.

2005 establishments in Haiti
Centrist parties in North America
Christian democratic parties in North America
Christianity in Haiti
Political parties established in 2005
Political parties in Haiti
Religious organizations based in Haiti